Exochomus aethiops, the round black ladybug, is a species of lady beetle in the family Coccinellidae. It is found in Central America and North America.

References

Further reading

 
 
 
 
 

Coccinellidae
Beetles described in 1864